The 1962 United States House of Representatives elections in South Carolina were held on November 6, 1962 to select six Representatives for two-year terms from the state of South Carolina.  The primary elections were held on June 12 and the runoff elections were held two weeks later on June 26.  All five incumbents who ran were re-elected and the open seat in the 2nd congressional district was retained by the Democrats.  The composition of the state delegation thus remained solely Democratic.

1st congressional district
Incumbent Democratic Congressman L. Mendel Rivers of the 1st congressional district, in office since 1941, was unopposed in his bid for re-election.

General election results

|-
| 
| colspan=5 |Democratic hold
|-

2nd congressional district special election
Incumbent Democratic Congressman John J. Riley of the 2nd congressional district died on January 1, 1962.  A special election was called and his widow, Corinne Boyd Riley, won the Democratic primary on February 13 and the special election on April 10 to serve out the remainder of the term.

Democratic primary

General election results

|-
| 
| colspan=5 |Democratic hold
|-

2nd congressional district
Incumbent Democratic Congresswoman Corinne Boyd Riley of the 2nd congressional district succeeded her husband, John J. Riley, in office upon his death in 1962.  She did not seek re-election and Democratic state Representative Albert Watson won the open seat against Republican Floyd Spence.

Democratic primary

General election results

|-
| 
| colspan=5 |Democratic hold
|-

3rd congressional district
Incumbent Democratic Congressman William Jennings Bryan Dorn of the 3rd congressional district, in office since 1951, was unopposed in his bid for re-election.

General election results

|-
| 
| colspan=5 |Democratic hold
|-

4th congressional district
Incumbent Democratic Congressman Robert T. Ashmore of the 4th congressional district, in office since 1953, won the Democratic primary was unopposed in the general election.

Democratic primary

General election results

|-
| 
| colspan=5 |Democratic hold
|-

5th congressional district
Incumbent Democratic Congressman Robert W. Hemphill of the 5th congressional district, in office since 1957, defeated Republican challenger Robert M. Doster.

General election results

|-
| 
| colspan=5 |Democratic hold
|-

6th congressional district
Incumbent Democratic Congressman John L. McMillan of the 6th congressional district, in office since 1939, defeated G. Stanley Bryant in the Democratic primary and was unopposed in the general election.

Democratic primary

General election results

|-
| 
| colspan=5 |Democratic hold
|-

See also
1962 United States House of Representatives elections
1962 United States Senate election in South Carolina
1962 South Carolina gubernatorial election
South Carolina's congressional districts

References

"Report of the Secretary of State to the General Assembly of South Carolina." Reports and Resolutions of South Carolina to the General Assembly of the State of South Carolina. Volume II. Columbia, SC: 1963, p. 149.
"Supplemental Report of the Secretary of State to the General Assembly of South Carolina." Reports and Resolutions of South Carolina to the General Assembly of the State of South Carolina. Volume II. Columbia, SC: 1963, pp. 16–17.

South Carolina
United States House of Representatives
1962